Robert Leo Kieffer (September 11, 1930 – August 12, 2017) was an American businessperson and politician from Maine. Kieffer, a Republican, served in the Maine State Senate from 1992 to 2000, representing his residence in Caribou, Maine as well as much of Aroostook County. He replaced fellow Republican Donald Collins, who did not seek re-election. Prior to serving in the State Senate, Kieffer served five years on the Caribou Town Council, including a stint as mayor (1991-1992). In February 1997, Kieffer was named legislator of the year by the Economic Development Council of Maine. From 1996 to 1998, Kieffer served as Assistant Senate Minority Leader.

Kieffer was born in Mauston, Wisconsin, served in the United States Army, and graduated from Madison College.

References

1930 births
2017 deaths
Mayors of places in Maine
People from Caribou, Maine
People from Mauston, Wisconsin
Military personnel from Wisconsin
Madison Business College alumni
Businesspeople from Maine
Maine city council members
Republican Party Maine state senators
20th-century American businesspeople